Erando Karabeci (born 6 September 1988) is an Albanian professional footballer who plays as a midfielder for Prishtina in the Kosovar Superliga. He mainly operates in the centre of midfield, but he can also play out wide as well as in a more defensive role in the midfield.

Club career

Early career
Born in Tiranë, Albania, Karabeci first joined local side Partizani Tirana at the age of 11 in 2000, where he progressed to the under-17s and then the under-19s, where he won the national championship with both age groups. He was promoted to the senior side during the 2006–07 season, where he made his professional debut as an 18-year-old in a home tie against Shkumbini Peqin on 23 December 2006. Karabeci came off the bench in the 89th minute for Gerhard Progni in the 2–0 win. He made another two league appearances that season in home wins over Kastrioti Krujë and Shkumbini Peqin once again. The following season, he still didn't break into the first team and only managed 3 league appearances throughout the 2007–08 campaign, including coming off the bench in the closing stages of a memorable Tirana Derby which ended in a 4–1 win for Partizani.

His breakthrough season came in 2008 when Shpëtim Duro took charge of Partizani, and Karabeci became one of the club's regular midfielders alongside Artan Karapici, Dritan Babamusta and Viktor Gjyla. He scored his first professional goal in the Tirana Derby against Tirana on 7 December 2008 in a 2–2 draw. Partizani struggled throughout the season, which ended in them finishing third from bottom and having to play Kastrioti Krujë in a play-out game for a spot in the following season's Albanian Superliga. The play-out game with Kastrioti ended was surrounded by controversy and notoriety, as Partizani lost 1–0 and the club's president Albert Xhani attacked the referee Arjan Mali for disallowing a Partizani equaliser. Following the game Partizani were relegated to the Albanian First Division and Karabeci was allowed to terminate his contract and leave the club.

Tirana

On 28 August 2009, Karabeci signed for Albanian Champions Tirana. He joined up with the team ahead of the international break which he spent with the Albanian U21 side. On 13 September 2009, he made his first appearance with Tirana during the 0–1 away win against Gramozi Ersekë, entering in the field in the 70th minute in place of Enco Malindi. In the next league match against Besa Kavajë on 19 September, Karabeci made his first start and played full-90 minutes in a goalless draw at Qemal Stafa Stadium.

He signed short term loan deal with Kukësi in July 2013 for their Europa League qualifying campaign, as a replacement for the suspended Besar Musolli.

On 18 December 2013, Karabeci scored his first goal with Tirana after his return from Kukësi during the 1–1 draw against Lushnja. On 7 February of the following year, he played full-90 minutes during the 1–0 triumph of Tirana against cross-town rivals of Partizani Tirana. He later scored his first league goal of the season, a long range strike in the 1–1 away draw against Teuta Durrës at Niko Dovana Stadium on 13 March. Tirana officially escaped relegation on 3 May 2014 in penultimate matchday after a 2–2 away draw against Flamurtari Vlorë, which Karabeci playing full-90 minutes. Karabeci concluded his 5th Tirana season by making 32 appearances between league and cup, scoring twice in the process.

Following the return of veteran Ervin Bulku in the summer of 2014, Karabeci handed his captaincy to Bulku as a sign of respect of the Albanian international, and became the vice-captain instead.

During the January 2015, Karabeci was named Albanian Superliga Player of the Month by the association "Sporti na bashkon". He scored his first goal of 2014–15 season against Apolonia Fier during the 2–2 draw at the neutral ground of Kastrioti Stadium, valid for the first leg of the quarter-final of Albanian Cup.

He ended the season with 37 appearances in all competitions, including 32 in the league, with Tirana who finished it in the fourth place and was eliminated in semi-finals of 2014–15 Albanian Cup against Laçi with the 1–0 aggregate.

He started the 2015–16 season by playing full-90 minutes in a 1–2 away win against the newcomers of Tërbuni Pukë on 23 August. In the next league match against Laçi at the neutral ground of Kastrioti Stadium, Karabeci scored a last-minute equaliser with a powerful shot that went in the triangle of Gentian Selmani's goal. On 21 September 2015, Karabeci made his 200th official appearance for Tirana during the 2–1 away league lose against Skënderbeu Korçë, assisting the goal of Masato Fukui in the 3rd minute.

Karabeci's 2016–17 season was marred by injures, as he was able to make only 23 league appearances without scoring. In January 2017, he suffered an injury while he has home which required surgery, keeping him sidelined for 2 months. He returned to action only on 31 March where he made a substitute appearance in the derby against Vllaznia Shkodër lost 1–2 at home. Tirana eventually ended the season by getting relegated for the first time in history after failing to win in the final matchday against Vllaznia Shkodër. In cup, Karabeci made 6 appearances, including the final, as Tirana was crowned the champions for a record 16th time after defeating Skënderbeu Korçë in the final.

Karabeci started the 2017–18 season by playing in the 2017–18 UEFA Europa League first qualifying round against Maccabi Tel Aviv. He played in both legs as Tirana was eliminated 5–0 on aggregate. On 6 September, Karabeci lifted Tirana's 11th Albanian Supercup trophy after defeating Kukësi 1–0 in the last minutes. Tirana also set a record by becoming the Albanian First Division side to win the Supercup. Karabeci scored the first goals of the season in the first leg of 2017–18 Albanian Cup first round against Besa Kavajë one week later. Three days later, he made his first ever Albanian First Division appearance in Tirana's 1–0 home win over Iliria Fushë-Krujë.

International career
He was picked for the Albania U-21 by the coach Artan Bushati to help the team for the UEFA U-21 Championship qualifier and is still considered a very important part of the team. He even managed to score the winning goal in Albania U-21's Qualifying game with Azerbaijan U-21 shortly after signing for his current club, KF Tirana.

He received his first call up to the senior Albania squad by coach Gianni De Biasi for the friendly matches against France & Italy on 14 & 18 November 2014. He was an unused substitute for both matches.

Career statistics

Club

Honours

Club
KF Tirana
Albanian Superliga: 2019–20
Albanian Cup: 2010–11, 2011–12, 2016-17
Albanian Supercup: 2011, 2012, 2017
 Albanian First Division : Winner Group B
 Albanian First Division : 2017-2018

KF Teuta
Albanian Superliga: 2020–21
Albanian Supercup: 2020

Individual
Albanian Superliga Player of the Month: January 2015

References

External links

Erando Karabeci profile FSHF.org

1987 births
Living people
Association football midfielders
Footballers from Tirana
Albanian footballers
Albania under-21 international footballers
Albania youth international footballers
FK Partizani Tirana players
KF Tirana players
FK Kukësi players
Kategoria Superiore players
Kategoria e Parë players